Francesco Pio de Savoya y de Moura (1672–1723) was a Spanish nobleman who held numerous hereditary and awarded titles. He was the 4th Duke of Nochera.

Life

Francesco was born in 1672 to Gilberto Pio de Savoya, who died when he was just four years old. The young Francesco therefore became 2nd Principe di San Gregorio and Marchese di Casape. From his mother, he inherited the titles of 6th Marques of Castelrodrigo and 4th Duke of Nochera.

He had a distinguished military career, being made a Field Marshal of the Imperial Spanish Army in 1705, inducted into the Order of the Golden Fleece in 1708 and made a Grandee of Spain in 1720. He went on to hold various governmental positions including Governor-General of the Kingdom of Sicily, Governor of Madrid and Captain-General of Catalonia.

He married some time before 1712 to Juana Spínola Colonna y de la Cerda (1683–1738), herself a scion of Spanish nobility, and they had 3 daughters: Margherita Eleonora, Lucrezia and Isabel Maria, who themselves all went on to marry high-ranking Spanish-Italian nobles. A son, Gisberto Pio de Saboya y Spinola, died without issue in 1776 and the hereditary titles were passed on through Isabel Maria's line.

Francesco drowned in Madrid, together with one daughter and his father-in-law on 15 September 1723, when a storm swept his carriage into the Manzanares River.

Legacy

During the 19th Century, the family titles passed to the Italian-Spanish Falcó family and when they died out in the mid-20th century, the titles passed to a Swiss-Italian family, Balbo Berti di Sambuy.

External links
 Principe Pio

1672 births
1732 deaths
Dukes of Spain
Captains General of Catalonia
Grandees of Spain
Knights of the Golden Fleece of Spain
Marquesses of Spain